The Venus girdle (Cestum veneris) is a comb jelly in the family Cestidae. It is the only member of its genus, Cestum.

Description
Venus girdles resemble transparent ribbons with iridescent edges. They may grow up to a metre in total length. Canals run the length of the ribbon in which bioluminesce activates when disturbed.

Distribution
This species is pelagic and is found in tropical and subtropical oceans worldwide in midwater.

Ecology
These animals swim horizontally using muscular contractions as well as the beating of the comb rows. The oral edge leads. They eat small crustaceans.

References

Cestidae
Monotypic eukaryote genera
Animals described in 1813